Fatialofa is a surname. Notable people with the surname include:

Alaifatu Junior Fatialofa (born 1980), New Zealand rugby union player
David Fatialofa, New Zealand rugby league player
Peter Fatialofa (1959–2013), Samoan rugby union player

See also
Rita Fatialofa-Paloto (born 1963), Samoan netball and softball player

Samoan-language surnames